Nathan Earl Cook (April 9, 1950 – June 11, 1988) was an American actor.

Life
Cook was born in Philadelphia, Pennsylvania. After graduation from Penn State University, he was hired as a member of the repertory company at Actors Theatre of Louisville in Kentucky. His eldest brother, Edward Cook (born December 22, 1947, died 1995) was a ballet dancer and choreographer in Europe.
After moving to Los Angeles in 1975, he was popularly known for roles on two television series.  He played Milton Reese, one of the high school basketball players, on The White Shadow (1978–1980).  He also played security head Billy Griffin on Hotel (1983–1988). Between these two he had a shorter role (1981–1982) as Detective Virgil Brooks in Hill Street Blues. An accomplished jazz flute player, he was involved for a time with the actress Alfre Woodard before marrying Cara Cook and having two children in 1984 and 1986.

He also made frequent appearances as a celebrity guest on the game shows Body Language, Super Password, and the $25,000 and $100,000 Pyramids, including helping a contestant win a $100,000 Pyramid Tournament of Champions in 1988. He also appeared as a celebrity in the 1987 game show pilot for Money in the Blank.

Death
Cook died on June 11, 1988, from a severe allergic reaction to penicillin. His body is interred at Forest Lawn Memorial Park.

Filmography

References

External links

Nathan Cook At Find A Grave

1950 births
1988 deaths
20th-century American male actors
American male television actors
Pennsylvania State University alumni
Male actors from Philadelphia
American male stage actors